C.P. Narayanan (born 28 September 1938, Birth Place - Wadakanchery, Thrissur, Kerala) is an Indian Politician belonging to the Communist Party of India (Marxist).He was elected as a member of the Rajya Sabha the Upper house of Indian Parliament from Kerala in July 2012.

Biography
He was born in September 1938 at Vadakkancherry, Thrissur district. After completing his BSc (HONS) from University of Kerala in 1958, and Post Graduate Degree in Mathematics and Statistics, he worked as a lecturer in mathematics at Malabar Christian College, Kozhikode from 1960-69. After that he spent five years at the Kerala Bhasha Institute, Thiruvananthapuram.

References

1938 births
Living people
Communist Party of India (Marxist) politicians from Kerala
Rajya Sabha members from Kerala
People from Thrissur district